The Independence Raptor is a German single-place, paraglider that was designed by Michaël Nesler and produced by Independence Paragliding of Eisenberg, Thuringia. It is now out of production.

The aircraft is not related to the Skif Raptor.

Design and development
The Raptor was designed as a competition glider, with an unusually low price as a method of assisting completion pilots. The models are each named for their relative size.

Company test pilot Christian Amon was also involved in the development as well as flight testing of the Raptor.

Variants
Raptor S
Small-sized model for lighter pilots.
Raptor M
Mid-sized model for medium-weight pilots.
Raptor L
Large-sized model for heavier pilots.

Specifications (Raptor L)

References

Raptor
Paragliders